Gilles Corrozet (1510 - 1568, Paris) was a French writer and printer-bookseller.

Life and works
Corrozet’s printer’s mark was a rose enclosed in a heart, punning on his name (Coeur rosier), and accompanied by the Biblical motto In corde prudentis requiescit sapientia (Wisdom resteth in the heart of him that hath understanding, Proverbs 14.33). His first productions date from 1532 and one of his specialities was to make available handy small-scale classical texts and influential illustrated works.

A poet himself, he was also responsible for publishing books by some of the principal authors of his era, Clément Marot, Pierre de Ronsard, Joachim du Bellay and Pierre Belon. His own poetic work accompanied the illustrations in his emblem book Hecatomographie (1540), which was followed soon after by his versifications of Aesop’s Fables, Les Fables du très ancien Esope, mises en rithme françoise (1542). He was also responsible for several historical and philosophical works.

Corrozet was the grandson of the Paris bookseller Pierre Le Brodeur and married as his second wife Catherine Cramoisy from the family of equally notable booksellers. Two of his sons followed him into the trade, while his daughter married Nicholas Bonfons from another printer-bookseller dynasty.

References

Information is drawn from the corresponding article in the French Wikipedia.

External links
 

1510 births
1568 deaths
16th-century French poets
French printers